Stormolla is an island in Vågan Municipality in Nordland county, Norway. It is located in the Lofoten islands, south of the large islands of Austvågøya and Hinnøya and northeast of the smaller islands of Litlmolla and Skrova.

The  island has a ferry connection from the northern tip of the island to the village of Digermulen on the neighboring island of Hinnøya.  Most of the 16 residents (2017) live in the small fishing village of Brettesnes on the southern tip of the island.

See also
List of islands of Norway

References

Islands of Nordland
Vågan